Dongye is a town in Yangcheng County, Shanxi province, China. , it administers the following 24 villages:
Dongye Village
Shenshuling Village
Dongxuan Village
Langzhuang Village
Xiye Village
Xiaowangzhuang Village
Duquan Village
Shangjie Village
Guhe Village
Jiangqu Village
Shenzitou Village
Caijie Village
Motan Village
Beidayu Village
Nandayu Village
Mashan Village
Xiangdi Village
Jianghe Village
Yueyuan Village
Gaoshi Village
Yaotou Village
Qiuquan Village
Nansigou Village
Gushan Village

See also
List of township-level divisions of Shanxi

References

Township-level divisions of Shanxi
Yangcheng County